This is a list of the best-selling singles in 2002 in Japan, as reported by Oricon.

References

2002 in Japanese music
2002
Oricon
Japanese music-related lists